Dr. Mary Patricia Seurkamp, Ph.D is the former President of Notre Dame of Maryland University from 1997 until her retirement in 2012. She is the first layperson to lead the school. The College (CNDM) was the first Roman Catholic college or university in the U.S. to open its doors to women seeking a baccalaureate degree.

Dr. Seurkamp led Notre Dame through a strategic planning process which reaffirmed CNDM's commitment to the education of women. Under her leadership, the institution unveiled its first doctoral program, in education, and created a school of pharmacy. In recognition of the new complexity, CNDM was rechristened Notre Dame of Maryland University (NDMU) in 2011. She represents the College on national and local boards. Before her arrival at Notre Dame, Dr. Seurkamp served at St. John Fisher College in Rochester, New York for 21 years.

She graduated from Webster University in 1968 with a B.A. degree in psychology, from Washington University in St. Louis in 1969 with an M.A. in guidance and counseling, and from the State University of New York at Buffalo in 1990 with a Ph.D in Higher Education.

Previous professional background
St. John Fisher College, Rochester, New York:
1996-1997: Vice-President for Institutional Planning & Research
1994-1996: Vice President for Academic Services & Planning
1992-1994: Acting Vice President for Academic Affairs/Dean of the College
1988-1992: Associate Vice President for Academic Affairs/Director of Student Academic Services

Affiliations
She serves on the SunTrust Regional Advisory Board and the SunTrust Mid-Atlantic Board of Directors.

References

External links
http://www.gscm.org/support/attachment/DW06/SeurkampBio.pdf
http://www.womenscolleges.org/news/notredame.htm
http://www.baltimoresun.com/news/opinion/ideas/bal-id.qa08p120070708042339,0,3173076.photo?coll=bal-home-headlines

American educational theorists
University at Buffalo alumni
Webster University alumni
Washington University in St. Louis alumni
American Roman Catholics
Year of birth missing (living people)
Living people
Place of birth missing (living people)
Notre Dame of Maryland University
St. John Fisher College